William J. Austin (May 27, 1822April 30, 1904) was an American miller, farmer, and politician.  He served one term in the Wisconsin State Assembly, representing Monroe County.

Biography

Born in the township of Johnston, Trumbull County, Ohio, Austin moved with his parents to Medina County, Ohio in 1825. Austin went to school in Poland, Ohio and was a farmer and teacher. In 1847, Austin moved to Sheboygan, Wisconsin Territory. He also lived in Rock County, Wisconsin. Then, in 1851, Austin moved to the town of  Leon, Monroe County, Wisconsin. Austin owned a mill and merchandise store in Leon, Wisconsin. He was a farmer. He served as Leon Town Treasurer and as superintendent of schools. In 1881, Austin served in the Wisconsin State Assembly and was a Republican. Austin died in Leon, Wisconsin.

Notes

1822 births
1904 deaths
People from Trumbull County, Ohio
People from Monroe County, Wisconsin
Millers
Educators from Ohio
Farmers from Ohio
Farmers from Wisconsin
Businesspeople from Wisconsin
Republican Party members of the Wisconsin State Assembly
19th-century American politicians
19th-century American educators